Emund Eriksson (?-c. 970), (English: Edmund), was a Swedish king whose historicity is only known from a single source, the Gesta Hammaburgensis ecclesiae pontificum which was written by Adam of Bremen in c. 1075.

Reign

According to Adam of Bremen, a certain King Ring ruled the Swedes together with his sons Erik and Emund in about 936. In a later chapter, Adam mentions Emund Eriksson as ruling Sweden some time in the second half of the 10th century. He was presumably the son of Erik Ringsson. Adam relates that Emund was king at the same time as King Harald Bluetooth of Denmark (c. 958/64-985) expanded his power overseas and subdued Norway (in about 970). Emund was an ally of Harald, and showed a friendly attitude to Christian people who came to him. That German missionary efforts were renewed about this time is related by Adam in the following chapter. The Archbishop of Hamburg-Bremen, Adaldag (937-988), appointed a Dane called Odinkar the Elder for the Swedish lands. Being a pious man of noble stock, he could "easily convince the wild peoples about everything concerning our religion".

Dynastic position

Emund Eriksson is not known to the later Norse sagas and king-lists. Information about him may have come from Adam's interview with the Danish King Sweyn Estridsen, Harald Bluetooth's great-grandson. To the extent that he is historical, he may have ruled in the third quarter of the 10th century. The next Swedish king mentioned by Adam of Bremen is Eric the Victorious (died c. 995), but he does not tell how they were related. It has even been speculated that Eric the Victorious belonged to a Geatic clan which gained power in the Mälaren Valley and founded Sigtuna in c. 980. Nevertheless, the name Emund was common in the late Viking Age dynasty of Sweden, but extremely rare outside of it, which suggests a dynastic continuity. An option is that Emund Eriksson was the brother of Björn (III) Eriksson, who the Norse sagas name as the son of Eric Anundsson and the father of Eric the Victorious. This would have been in accordance with the Germanic system of co-rulership (Diarchy) in which two brothers were elected kings and which, according to the sagas, was sometimes used by the Swedes. If this is the case, several generations of Swedish rulers were conflated by tradition, explaining the differences between Adam of Bremen and the Norse sagas.

See also
Early Swedish History

References

Semi-legendary kings of Sweden
House of Munsö
10th-century Swedish monarchs